The following television stations in the United States brand as channel 4 (though neither using virtual channel 4 nor broadcasting on physical RF channel 4):
 KTKB-LD in Tamuning, Guam
 KVEO-DT2 Brownsville, Texas
 KXJB-LD in Fargo, North Dakota
 WCIV-DT2 in Charleston, South Carolina
 WCYB-DT2 in Bristol, Virginia
 WEEK-DT3 in Peoria, Illinois
 WFTX-TV in Cape Coral, Florida
 WGFL in High Springs, Florida
 WNYA in Pittsfield, Massachusetts
 WOTV in Battle Creek, Michigan

04 branded